The Lopukhin family was a noble family of the Russian Empire, forming one of the branches of the Sorokoumov-Glebov family.

History 
The family prominence started when Eudoxia Lopukhina married Peter the Great. When Pyotr Lopukhin's son died childless, the family's princely title passed to Nikolai Petrovich Demidov-Lopukhin. The present Prince Lopukhin-Demidov is Nikolai Alexander Paul Demidoff born in 1976.

Members
Anna Lopukhina (1777–1805), a (perhaps platonic) mistress of Emperor Paul of Russia
Barbara Bakhmeteva (née Lopukhina; 1815–1851), Russian noblewoman, a muse of Mikhail Lermontov
Eudoxia Lopukhina (1669–1731), the first wife of Peter I of Russia
Ivan Lopukhin (1756–1816), Russian philosopher, mystic, writer and humanitarian
Natalia Lopukhina (1699–1781), a daughter of Matryona Balk, who was sister of Anna Mons and Willem Mons
Pyotr Lopukhin (1753–1827), Russian politician

Sources

Библиография

Other
  Almanach de St. Petersbourg Cour. Monde et Ville... [1910 — 1914]. — St.Petersbourg — Leipzig, 1910—1914.
  Dolgorukow P. Memoires du prince Pierre Dolgorukow. T. 1, 1-ere livre. Geneve, 1867, Сh. З.
  Gorzynski В., Kochunowski J. Herby szlachty polskiej. Warszawa. 1990.
  Ikonnikov N. La Noblesse de Russie. Recueile genealogique. T. F1. Les Lopoukhine. Paris, 1932. 35 p.
  Kleinschmidt A. Russland Geschichte und Politik... Cassel, 1877. XVI, 560 S.
  Oswalt. G. Lexikon Heraldik. Leipzig, 1984.
 Our Family's Album (A genealogical and photographic Chronicle of the descendants of Prince Nicolai Petrovich Troubetzkoy (1828—1900)). — Seaclif, New-York, 1995.
 Roosevelt Priscilla. Life on the Russian Country Estate. A social and Cultural History.
 The Duke's Leuchtenberg Ancestry and Relationships. The Lopukhins. N.-Y., 1980. Chart L.
  Tzocca, Madame La Coque (T.I. Lopukhine)/ Ricordi E Diari (1914—1921)/ Parte I. Dal Giugno 1914 al Gemnaio 1917. Parte II. Gli Albori della Rivoluzione Russa e del Bolscevismo (1917—1918). Рукопись на итальянском языке, датированная февр. 1944 г. Хранится у кн. В. О. Лопухина.